Alan Shepherd (28 September 1935 – 16 July 2007) was a British Grand Prix motorcycle road racer. His best seasons were in 1962 and 1963, when he rode a Matchless to finish in second place in the 500cc world championship, both times to Mike Hailwood. Shepherd was a three-time winner of the North West 200 race in Northern Ireland and finished on the podium twice at the Isle of Man TT.


Motorcycle racing career

Shepherd was born in Keswick, Cumbria. His family moved to Cartmel at the outbreak of World War II. His first motorcycle was a Royal Enfield Bullet earned from a job doing a milk round with his father. He later moved to Bradford where he served as an apprentice cabinet maker. Shepherd was a member of the Royal Signals Motorcycle Display Team during his National Service. 

In 1956, Shepherd was persuaded to compete in the Isle of Man TT. He rode his own motorcycle to the dock in Liverpool and took the ferry to the Isle where, he finished in an impressive third place in the Clubmans Junior TT at the 1956 Isle of Man TT. Shepherd won the 1958 Junior Manx Grand Prix riding an AJS. He scored a double victory at the 1962 North West 200 when he claimed first place results in the 350cc and 500cc classes.

Shepherd's greatest success came when he joined the East German MZ factory racing team led by their lead Development Engineer Walter Kaaden, known for his groundbreaking work in two stroke engine technology. Although MZ provided him with a motorcycle, the impoverished factory struggled to provide much support and, he competed while functioning as his own mechanic. Despite competing on a limited budget, Shepherd managed to finish the 1964 250cc world championship season in third place behind the powerful Yamaha and Honda teams represented by Phil Read and Jim Redman.

In 1964 when a resident of Grange-over-Sands, Lancashire, England, he was allowed to keep his MZ 125 cc single cylinder and MZ 250 cc twin cylinder machines as part of his earnings due to currency difficulties with East Germany. He offered these two MZ for sale through Motor Cycle, a UK weekly magazine.

Shepherd retired in 1965 after recovering from a head injury suffered in late 1964 when testing a works Honda in preparation for the 1964 Japanese Grand Prix. He told Motor Cycle's David Dixon in June 1965 that – whilst he felt fully recovered – he no longer had the confidence to be a top-runner, and would not ride Hondas unless he could give the best possible performance.

He died peacefully at Summerhill Nursing Home, Kendal, Cumbria in July 2007, with a funeral service at Cartmel Priory followed by cremation at Lancaster.

Motorcycle Grand Prix results

(key) (Races in italics indicate fastest lap)

References

1935 births
2007 deaths
English motorcycle racers
Isle of Man TT riders
People from Cartmel
People from Grange-over-Sands
Sportspeople from Kendal
People from Keswick, Cumbria
Sportspeople from Bradford
125cc World Championship riders
250cc World Championship riders
350cc World Championship riders
500cc World Championship riders
Sportspeople from Cumbria